Corkscrew was a steel roller coaster located at Alton Towers theme park, near Alton in the English shire county of Staffordshire, United Kingdom. Corkscrew was manufactured for Alton Towers by Dutch company Vekoma, engineered by Werner Stengel of German Ing.-Büro Stengel GmbH (Ingenieur Büro Stengel). The coaster was located in the Ug Land area, formerly called Talbot Centre. It was the theme park's oldest ride and is considered the greatest factor in promoting the new theme park to the British public. It was one of the first double-inverting coasters in England, and it was well received publicly in the 1980s.

History

In 1979, John Broome, one of the then directors of Alton Towers, wanted to make the Towers and Gardens into a new style of leisure attraction.

On , Corkscrew opened to a crowd of 30,000. It became the main attraction of the park, and led to attendance numbers doubling from 500,000 in 1979, to over 1,000,000 in 1980. It was a Vekoma MK1200 Corkscrew with Bayern curve. Two trains of six cars (24 riders per train, four in each car) were a patriotic red, white, and blue, and the entry and exit station was blue and white.

In 1984, more attractions were built in the new 'Festival Park' along with Enterprise and the Twirling Toadstool (then Wave Swinger).

When a newly themed area called Ug Land opened in 1999, Corkscrew's appearance was modified.  Its trains and track received a new paint scheme, and dinosaur-themed props were placed around the ride, including a dinosaur skeleton that guests would pass under in the waiting line queue.

In 2005, a new roller coaster called Rita was built (originally known as Rita: Queen of Speed), as well as there being several other changes to the park.  This resulted in Corkscrew becoming dated, and eventually a decreasingly popular attraction of the park.  Customers also reported that due to its age, it had become increasingly bumpy and uncomfortable to ride.

In October 2008, after 28 years of service, Alton Towers confirmed that the ride was to be dismantled at the end of the 2008 season, to make room for the 2010 attraction TH13TEEN, built under the codename Secret Weapon 6, or SW6.  On 9 November 2008, after carrying an estimated 43.5 million thrill-seeking passengers, Alton Towers held a special event in honour of the attraction in which the Corkscrew completed the final circuit of its  track.  The official date for the last day in regular service was 2 November 2008 - the last day of the season.

After being dismantled, the section of track which formed the two corkscrew inversions was saved, and repainted blue and gold.  It is now displayed at the main entrance to the park near the ticket booths.

Ride experience
Once it had reached the top, the car went round a turn and down the  drop reaching a maximum . The train then pulled through a camel hump and a 180-degree turn, before entering the two Corkscrew inversions (a double-helix type manoeuvre). Once the train exited the two inversions, it then went around a 180-degree turn and into some trim brakes. After that, the train went across another camel hump, and in to the Bayern-curve, and around the perimeter of the coaster again, before going into the brakes and station.

The Corkscrew became a very rough ride toward the end of its life, and contributed to the decision to dismantle it in 2008.

Popular culture

Footage of the Corkscrew and the Pirate Ship feature in the music video for British doo-wop band Darts cover of Let's Hang On!.

The opening title sequence used by The ITV Chart Show between 7 January 1989 and 30 November 1991 was created by digitally rotoscoping footage of the Corkscrew.  A photograph of the Corkscrew was used on the cover of the 1991 single Everybody in the Place by The Prodigy.

One of the Corkscrew's train cars was put up for sale on eBay.  The car was sold on 15 December 2008 for £7,200, and these funds went to good causes.  Alton Towers retained the famous corkscrew inversions, which were refurbished, and placed as an artwork feature in the entrance plaza.

References

External links

Corkscrew on Alton Towers Net
Corkscrew data on Theme Park Junkies

Alton Towers
1980 establishments in England
2008 disestablishments in England
Roller coasters in the United Kingdom